Laurel Creek is an unincorporated community and coal town in Fayette County, West Virginia, United States.

The community takes its name from nearby Laurel Creek.

References 

Unincorporated communities in West Virginia
Unincorporated communities in Fayette County, West Virginia
Coal towns in West Virginia